The Browning is an American electronicore band formed in Kansas City, Missouri in 2005. The band's musical style is characterized by an eclectic blending of electronicore and deathcore. The group currently consists of vocalist Jonny McBee, drummer Cody Stewart, bassist Akeem Bivens, and guitarist Jon Yadon Jr. They are currently signed to Spinefarm Records. The band has released five studio albums and two EPs.

History 
Formed in early 2005, The Browning was originally a solo project of Jonny Mcbee. Later, the rapper Matt Keck joined the project.

Later on in 2010, Matt Keck left The Browning to be a comedian, and appeared on Tosh.0 in a viewer video titled "I'm a Snake". The two EPs saw a change in style as drummer Noah Robertson, guitarist Brian Cravey, and bassist Jesse Glidewell joined. In late 2011, Brian Cravey was replaced with Collin Woroniak, and they released their video for "Bloodlust". The band's debut studio album, Burn This World, was released in October 2011 on Earache Records.

During early 2012, The Browning toured with Fear Factory and Shadows Fall on the Noise in the Machine Tour. During this time, guitarist Drew Ellis joined the band, making their largest line-up to date. They also toured with Static-X on the Noise Revolution tour. The band performed With Full Force Festival in Germany in the summer of 2012 and toured on the Impericon Never Say Die! European Tour in October 2012. Shane Robinson, St. Louis Cardinal's Center Fielder used the song "Ashamed" as his official walk-out song in 2012.

On November 16, 2012, it was announced that Noah Robertson and Jesse Glidewell were leaving the band. Drew Ellis switched to bass and Cody Stewart was asked to join as their new drummer. Jonny McBee is now the only original member.

On August 2, 2013, the band announced that they would release the second studio album entitled Hypernova through Earache Records as well as releasing a new song from that record entitled "Gravedigger".

On January 27, 2015, it was released to the public that Alex Maggard would be the fifth member of the band, making the lineup its largest since 2012. On July 26, Collin Woroniak announced via Facebook that he would be leaving The Browning for unknown reasons. Woroniak returned in the summer of 2018, first as a fill-in and later full time, as the bassist/vocalist.

On June 24, 2016, the band released their third studio album, Isolation. On August 16, 2018, the band released the song "Carnage" featuring Jake Hill. Besides eleven other tracks, this song would be part of their fourth studio album Geist. The new album was released on October 26, 2018. On December 3, 2021, the band released their fith studio album End of Existence. This album was recorded and performed entirely by frontman Jonny McBee. On June 19, 2022, bassist/guitarist Collin Woroniak announced via Twitter that he was no longer in the band.

Musical style 
While originally a rap/metal project, The Browning now plays what can be described as a combination of extreme metal with strong electronic characteristics. Their electronic side incorporates hardstyle, trance, electronica, and dubstep, while their metal side incorporates metalcore, deathcore elements. Their signature style is a hybrid of double-bass drumming, 808s, and chugging; creating a solid, pounding rhythm layered with electronics. Their lyrics focus on many different topics, such as sci-fi themed songs with aliens, zombies, vampires, Pokémon or songs with positive messages.

Members 
Current
 Jonny McBee – lead vocals (2005–present); programming (2010–present); all instruments (2005–2010)
 Cody Stewart – drums (2012–present)
 Akeem Bivens – bass (2022–present)
 Jon Yadon Jr. – guitars (2022–present)

Former
 Matt Keck – lead vocals (2009–2010)
 Brian Cravey – guitars (2010–2011)
 Dustin Albright – guitars (2011–2012)
 Jesse Glidewell – bass (2010–2012)
 Noah Robertson – drums (2010–2012)
 Drew Ellis – bass (2012–2015); guitars (2012)
 Alex Maggard – guitars, backing vocals (2015–2016)
 Rick Lalicker – bass (2016–2018)
 Brian Moore – guitars (2016–2021); bass (2015–2016)
 Collin Woroniak – bass (2018–2022); backing vocals (2011–2015, 2018–2022); guitars (2011–2015, 2021–2022)

Timeline

Discography

EPs 
 2010: Standing on the Edge
 2011: Time Will Tell

Singles 
 2013: "Gravedigger"
 2016: "Pure Evil"
 2016: "Dragon"
 2016: "Disconnect"
 2016: "Pathologic"
 2018: "Carnage"
 2018: "Final Breath"
 2018: "Geist"
 2021: "End of Existence"
 2021: "Chaos Reigns"

References

External links 
 
 

Metalcore musical groups from Missouri
American industrial metal musical groups
American deathcore musical groups
Musical groups established in 2005
Electronicore musical groups